AF4/FMR2 family member 1 is a protein that in humans is encoded by the AFF1 gene. At its same location was a record for a separate PBM1 gene, which has since been withdrawn and considered an alias. It was previously known as AF4 (ALL1-fused gene from chromosome 4).

The gene is a member of the AF4/FMR2 (AFF) family, a group of nuclear transcriptional activators which encourage RNA elongation. It is a component of the super elongation complex. It is recognized as a proto-oncogene: chromosomal translocations associated with leukemia can fuse this gene with others like KMT2A, producing an uncontrolled activator protein.

References

External links

Further reading